is a Japanese former professional motorcycle racer. He competed in Grand Prix motorcycle racing from 1994 to 1999. Manako is notable for finishing in the top three of the 125cc world championship for three consecutive years, narrowly missing out on the title in 1998.

Early career 
Manako began racing at the relatively late age of 21, competing in the Kyushu Area and Suzuka Area Championship.

1994 
Manako began competing at national level in the 125cc All-Japan Road Racing Championship and finished the season 7th. Spotted by Honda, he was offered a ride on an RVF750 in the Suzuka 8 Hour Endurance race. Partnered by Tekeshi Tsujimura he finished in 13th place. Midway through the year he was offered a Honda ride in the 125cc World Championship with the FCC Technical Sports team as a replacement for their injured rider Tomoko Igata. He finished 3rd in his first race and ended the season 20th overall.

1995 
Now a full-time Grand Prix rider with the team, Manako scored two more 3rd positions and was consistently finishing inside the Top 10. He finished the season 8th overall, and won the Rookie of the Year award. He again rode in the Suzuka 8 Hour with Tsujimura finishing 15th on board an RVF750.

1996 
Moving to the UGT Europa team, Manako visited the podium four times, one of which was his maiden Grand Prix win at the Catalunya Grand Prix. He finished 3rd in the Championship and won the IRTA Cup. He was now firmly established as one of the top riders in the 125cc class.

1997 
The team was now named UGT 3000, and Manako again had an impressive run of form. While another victory eluded him, he scored four 2nd places and two 3rds to finish yet again 3rd in the Championship.

1998 
1998 was the high point of Manako’s career as he put in some outstanding performances in what was to become a dramatic and controversial battle for the title. Apart from 3 DNFs, he never finished off the podium in 14 races, netting 5 wins. His main rival was Kazuto Sakata who had gained an early lead in the title chase. In the second half of the season however Manako was fast and consistent and had closed the gap considerably. After the penultimate round in the 1998 125cc Australian Grand Prix, a fuel sample was taken from Sakata’s machine which was found to be in breach of technical regulations. He was excluded from the results of the race, thus losing out on 13 points for his 4th place. His Aprilia team lodged an appeal against the decision. 

With one round remaining, Manako could still win the title if he won the 1998 125cc Argentine Grand Prix with Sakata finishing lower than 4th. Charging through the pack, Manako took the win, while Sakata could only finish 5th. Bizarrely, though Manako now had one more point than Sakata, he could not be crowned Champion as Sakata’s appeal was still pending. In November 1998 the FIM found in favour of Sakata and restored his 13 points from the Australian Grand Prix. Sakata claimed the 125 title by 12 points.

1999 
Manako switched to the 250cc class riding a Yamaha for Team Kurz. However the bike was underpowered and uncompetitive against the works machines of the day, and Manako could only manage a best finish of 8th. He ended his final world championship season in 15th place.

2000 
He returned to Japanese domestic racing, this time with Kawasaki where he ran a ZX-9R, scoring a 3rd and a 5th. He also piloted a ZX-12R to 14th place in the Suzuka 8 Hours endurance race with Shigeru Yamashita.

Post-racing career 
His association with Kawasaki lead to him becoming Chief Development Rider for their 2007 ZX-6R, launched in December 2006.

Grand Prix career statistics

(key) (Races in bold indicate pole position; races in italics indicate fastest lap)

References 

1972 births
Living people
People from Saga Prefecture
125cc World Championship riders
Japanese motorcycle racers
250cc World Championship riders